Devarn Rohan Green (born 26 August 1996) is an English professional footballer who plays as a forward for  club Oldham Athletic.

A former trainee at Burton Albion and Blackburn Rovers, he played non-league football for Hednesford Town, Stourbridge, Tranmere Rovers and Southport, before he was signed by Scunthorpe United in January 2020.

Career

Early career
Green spent time at Burton Albion, before joining Blackburn Rovers at the age of 16 on a two-year scholarship, following a two-week trial in July 2013. However he left Ewood Park in the summer of 2016. He spent time at Hednesford Town, before it was reported that he had "decided to move away from Keys Park in order to pursue opportunities elsewhere" on 21 September 2017. Later that month he joined Northern Premier League Premier Division rivals Stourbridge, who sold him on to Tranmere Rovers of the National League for an undisclosed fee on 28 October. He signed a two-year contract with Southport on 27 June 2018.

Scunthorpe United
He signed for EFL League Two club Scunthorpe United on 31 January 2020; he signed an 18-month contract after being purchased for an undisclosed fee. He made his debut in the English Football League for the "Iron" on 29 February, coming on as a 42nd-minute substitute for Abo Eisa in a 2–2 draw at Port Vale.

He was released by the club on 31 January 2022.

AFC Telford United
On 8 March 2022, Green signed for National League North side AFC Telford United.

Oldham Athletic
On 17 February 2023, Green signed for National League club Oldham Athletic on a short-term deal until the end of the season following a successful trial period.

Career statistics

References

1996 births
Living people
English footballers
Association football forwards
Burton Albion F.C. players
Blackburn Rovers F.C. players
Hednesford Town F.C. players
Stourbridge F.C. players
Tranmere Rovers F.C. players
Southport F.C. players
Scunthorpe United F.C. players
AFC Telford United players
Oldham Athletic A.F.C. players
Northern Premier League players
English Football League players
National League (English football) players
Black British sportspeople